An Impossible Love is a 2018 French romantic drama film co-written and directed by Catherine Corsini, based on the 2015 novel of the same name by Christine Angot. Starring Virginie Efira, Niels Schneider and Jehnny Beth, the film chronicles the life of office worker Rachel as she falls in love with the wealthy Philippe, gives birth to their daughter Chantal, and raises Chantal as a single mother while maintaining a complicated relationship with Philippe.

Plot
In the late 1950s in Châteauroux, France, Rachel, a modest office worker, meets Philippe, a brilliant young man born to a bourgeois family. This brief but passionate connection results in the birth of a daughter, Chantal. Philippe refuses to marry outside of his social class and Rachel has to raise their daughter alone. Regardless, Chantal is a great source of happiness for Rachel. She wishes for Philippe to legally acknowledge his daughter, which would give her his last name. A battle of more than ten years ensues, which will eventually break up all of their lives.

Cast
 Virginie Efira as Rachel Steiner
 Niels Schneider as Philippe Arnold
 Jehnny Beth as Chantal
 Ambre Hasaj as Chantal at 3–5 years old
 Sasha Alessandri-Torrès Garcia as Chantal at 6–8 years old
 Estelle Lescure as Chantal in adolescence

Reception
In France, the film averages 3,7/5 on the AlloCiné from 32 press reviews. On the review aggregator website Rotten Tomatoes, the film holds an approval rating of 100% based on reviews from 21 critics, with an average rating of 7.3/10.

References

External links
 

2018 films
2018 romantic drama films
2010s French films
2010s French-language films
Films based on French novels
Films directed by Catherine Corsini
Films set in the 1950s
Films set in France
France 3 Cinéma films
French romantic drama films
Incest in film